5140 may refer to:

In general
 A.D. 5140, a year in the 6th millennium CE
 5140 BCE, a year in the 6th millennium BC
 5140, a number in the 5000 (number) range

Products
 Nokia 5140, a cellphone
 IBM 5140, the IBM PC Convertible, one of the first laptop computers
 SIG GL 5140, a variant of the SIG GL 5040, a grenade launcher

Other uses
 5140 Kida, an asteroid in the Asteroid Belt, the 5140th asteroid registered

See also